The Outlaws is a crime thriller comedy television series created by Elgin James and Stephen Merchant, and directed by Merchant and John Butler. It is shown on BBC One and iPlayer in the UK and Amazon Prime Video in some international territories. Filming of series 1 was halted in March 2020 due to the COVID-19 pandemic. In January 2021 it was confirmed that a second series had been ordered, with series 1 production resuming in February 2021. It was later confirmed that both series had been filmed back to back.

Plot
The story follows seven strangers from different walks of life who are forced together to complete a Community Payback sentence, set in Bristol. However, their luck changes – not necessarily for the better – when they discover a bag full of money, unaware that its true owners are very dangerous.

Cast
 Christopher Walken as Frank Sheldon, an American former conman living with his estranged daughter and grandchildren.
 Stephen Merchant as Greg Dillard, an unsuccessful and socially inept lawyer attempting to rebuild his love life following his divorce.
 Rhianne Barreto as Rani Rekowski, a prospective Oxford applicant who struggles under the expectations and high standards of her strict and austere parents.
 Gamba Cole as Ben Eastfield, a young nightclub security guard looking after his younger sister, who assumes the identity of Christian Taylor to carry out community service in his name.
 Darren Boyd as John Halloran, a businessman and "right wing blow-hard" who struggles to impress his unloving father and keep his struggling business afloat
 Clare Perkins as Myrna Okeke, an activist and "left wing militant" who frequently clashes with John, whilst struggling with guilt over the death of a police officer for which she was responsible.
 Eleanor Tomlinson as Lady Gabriella "Gabby" Penrose-Howe, an out-of-touch socialite, reality TV star and social media influencer with anger management and substance abuse issues. 
 Jessica Gunning as Diane Pemberley, a former juvenile delinquent, now acting as both a supervisor for community service, and later a PCSO, with an inflated sense of authority.
 Dolly Wells as Margaret, Frank's daughter.
 Ian McElhinney as John Halloran Snr., John's father.
 Nina Wadia as Shanthi Rekowski, Rani's mother.
 Gyuri Sarossy as Jerzy Rekowski, Rani's father.
 Aiyana Goodfellow as Esme Eastfield, Ben's sister.
 Charles Babalola as Christian Taylor, a drug dealer running a drug operation in Bristol for the Dean.
 James Nelson-Joyce as Aiden "Spider" Haswell, a drug dealer who works for Christian.
 Guillermo Bedward as Tom, Frank's grandson.
 Isla Gie as Holly, Frank's granddaughter.
 Claes Bang as the Dean, the biggest drug dealer in Bristol.
 Tom Hanson as Spencer Fitzwilliam, Greg's sleazy and mean-spirited colleague who bullies him.
 Sam Troughton as Mr Wilder, Diane's superior.
 Richard E. Grant as the Earl of Gloucestershire, Gabby's aristocratic absentee father.
 Grace Calder as DS Lucy Haines
 Kojo Kamara as DS Selforth
 Michael Cochrane as Mr Kingsley, Greg's boss.
 Gerard Horan as Graham Hilgard
 Marcus Fraser as Souljah, a drug dealer who works for Christian.
 Alexandria Riley as Yvonne, Myrna's sister.
 Elizabeth Dulau as Lesley
 Julia Davis as Rita; series 2 only

Episodes

Series 1 (2021)

Series 2 (2022)

Production
After some delays due to the COVID-19 pandemic, filming on location in Bristol began in February 2021, as well as at The Bottle Yard Studios in Whitchurch. The series is a co-production between BBC One and Amazon Studios. The series was commissioned by BBC Comedy and BBC One, produced by Big Talk with Stephen Merchant's Four Eyes. The series is created by Stephen Merchant and Elgin James. Executive producers are Stephen Merchant for Four Eyes; and Luke Alkin, Kenton Allen, and Matthew Justice for Big Talk. Kate Daughton is the Commissioning Editor for the BBC.
Directors are Stephen Merchant and John Butler. Producer is Nickie Sault. Originally announced with the working title The Offenders, the series was renamed during production, with the current title confirmed in September 2021.

A small piece of Banksy's art was used on set.

Broadcast
The series premiered on BBC One and BBC iPlayer in the UK on 25 October 2021; it was later released on Amazon Prime Video in the United States, Canada, Australia, New Zealand and Nordic countries.

Series 2 was released in full on BBC iPlayer on 5 June 2022.

Accolades
On 9 January, 2023 the show received a nomination at the Comedy.co.uk Awards 2022 in the Best Comedy Drama Series category. On 23 January, 2023 Merchant received a nomination in the Outstanding Comedy Actor category at the National Comedy Awards 2023.

References

External links
 
 
 

2021 British television series debuts
2020s British comedy-drama television series
2020s British crime television series
British thriller television series
Amazon Prime Video original programming
BBC Television shows
BBC comedy-drama television shows
English-language television shows
Television shows set in Bristol
Television shows shot in Bristol
Television series by Big Talk Productions
Television productions suspended due to the COVID-19 pandemic